Wörschach is a municipality in the district of Liezen in the Austrian state of Styria.

Geography
Wörschach lies on the southern border of Upper Austria.

References

Cities and towns in Liezen District